The women's 500 metres speed skating event was part of the speed skating at the 1960 Winter Olympics programme. It was the first appearance of a women's event in Olympic speed skating. The competition was held on the Squaw Valley Olympic Skating Rink and for the first time at the Olympics on artificially frozen ice. It was held on Saturday, February 20, 1960. Twenty-three speed skaters from ten nations competed.

Medalists

Records
These were the standing world and Olympic records (in seconds) prior to the 1960 Winter Olympics.

(*) The record was set in a high altitude venue (more than 1000 metres above sea level) and on naturally frozen ice.

Helga Haase set the first Olympic record with 45.9 seconds.

Results

Helga Haase became the first ever female Olympic champion in speed skating.

References

External links
Official Olympic Report
 

Women's speed skating at the 1960 Winter Olympics
Olymp
Skat